Olivier Edouard Louis Collarini (born 27 November 1863, date of death unknown) was an Italian fencer. He competed in the individual foil and épée events at the 1900 Summer Olympics.

References

External links
 

1863 births
Year of death missing
Italian male fencers
Olympic fencers of Italy
Fencers at the 1900 Summer Olympics
Fencers from Paris
Place of death missing